The Duck Hunt dog is a fictional character from the 1984 NES video game Duck Hunt. The dog, which is a beagle breed, appears as one of the only visible living creatures within the game, scaring ducks out from hiding. If players miss the duck, the dog will laugh at them. This has resulted in a great deal of resentment for him, with several sources referring to him as the most disliked character in Nintendo history. Several fan media depict the Duck Hunt dog being shot, a popular concept amongst fan labor works, including a CollegeHumor video. The dog also appears in  Super Smash Bros. for Nintendo 3DS and Wii U and Super Smash Bros. Ultimate as a playable character representing the Duck Hunt series.

Characteristics and design
Nintendo Research & Development 1 developed  the Duck Hunt game in 1984, which was supervised by Takehiro Izushi,  and designed by Hiroji Kiyotake. In the game, the dog would emerge from the grass and laugh at the player if they failed to shoot any of the ducks that appeared during the round. If the player did shoot a duck, the dog would also emerge with the duck in his hands. In the beginning of each game, the dog will appear from the left of the screen and start sniffing the ground, jumping in the grass to hide only a couple seconds later. Some players have thought that the dog can actually be shot when it laughs at the player, though this is not possible in the console version of the game. In Super Smash Bros., the dog is mostly reliant on setting up projectile attacks, and his infamous laugh is used during his entrance animation, a taunt, victory animation and his final smash. He notably not only represents Duck Hunt, but also various other games that utilized the NES Zapper, such as Hogan's Alley (with his neutral special) and Wild Gunman (with his down special). The dog's neutral special also let Duck Hunt throws explosive cans to player, sometimes causing self-destruct and an advantage combo breaker. The explosive cans can be used to control the stage, flicking them around also with gunshots as a combination attacks.

History

The Duck Hunt dog first appeared in the NES video game Duck Hunt, which was also included in a bundle called Super Mario Bros./Duck Hunt, packaged with the NES. In the A game of Duck Hunt, the dog searches for ducks, and when one is found, he will jump into the bushes to flush it out, allowing players to shoot at it with the included NES Zapper. If a duck is hit, it will fall into the bushes, and the dog will pick it up. However, if all of the ducks on screen fly away, the dog comes up and laughs at the player. This has been a source of resentment by players, causing popularity for the concept of shooting the dog. While believed to be an urban legend, the arcade version of Duck Hunt titled Vs. Duck Hunt includes a more difficult mode, where the dog will jump to get the ducks, getting in the way of the players. If players shoot the dog, his face will be damaged, while also wearing a cast and using crutches. He will then say "Ouch! Shoot the ducks, not me!". He has had roles in other video games. One of his earliest cameo roles was in the NES video game Barker Bill's Trick Shooting. He would also appear in several WarioWare video games, including WarioWare, Inc.: Mega Microgame$! for the Game Boy Advance, WarioWare, Inc.: Mega Party Game$! for the Nintendo GameCube, and WarioWare D.I.Y. Showcase for the WiiWare service.

The character also appeared in a Duck Hunt themed stage in Tetris DS, and as a playable character in Super Smash Bros. for Nintendo 3DS and Wii U and Super Smash Bros. Ultimate. Both the Duck Hunt team and stage reappear in Super Smash Bros. Ultimate, and the team featured in the June 2019 trailer announcing Banjo & Kazooie as downloadable content for Ultimate. In the 2015 Sony film Pixels, the dog has a cameo appearance, where he is given as a "trophy" by the aliens when Sam Brenner (Adam Sandler) and Ludlow Lamonsoff (Josh Gad) defeat the creatures of the video game Centipede. He stays in the house of an old woman in London. The premise for the psychological horror VR game Duck Season by Stress Level Zero is based in part on Duck Hunt. The dog makes a cameo appearance in the NES game Barker Bill's Trick Shooting (another Zapper game) and he can be shot. In Wii Play (2006) and its sequel Wii Play: Motion (2011) some elements from Duck Hunt and Hogan's Alley are included in the mini-games "Shooting Range" and "Trigger Twist" in which some of the various targets are ducks and cans.

Reception
Since appearing in Duck Hunt, the dog has become an iconic video game character, as well as a symbol of annoyance. A CollegeHumor video depicted the dog laughing at the star of the video due to his failings, which include getting fired and failing to please his girlfriend. IGN described him as the bane of their existence, including him in their "Annoying Character Hall of Fame", calling him the "most annoying pooch they couldn't kill." In 2007, IGN editor Lucas M. Thomas named the Duck Hunt dog as one character he would like to see in Super Smash Bros. Brawl, calling him the most despised animal character in Nintendo history. GamesRadar listed him as the most annoying sidekick ever, discussing how as opposed to introducing interesting characters, they used the dog as a character who would mock their failures. However, they added that without him, Duck Hunt would be less of an icon. However, they also listed him as the seventh best canine companion, stating that they think that he is laughing with the player, as opposed to at the player. Brian Crecente of Kotaku listed him as one of his favorite video game dogs, stating that the dog's character design reminded him of Tex Avery cartoons. David Lozada of GameRevolution described the Duck Hunt dog as the most despicable gaming villain of all time, stating that "what makes the Duck Hunt dog such a despicable villain lies not in its motives or clever subterfuge, but in its laugh." He was also described as the most annoying video game character of all time. Masahiro Sakurai described the Duck Hunt dog along with Mr. Game & Watch as fighter that fall "outside of people's typical expectations", and explained further that without such characters the roster might only have typical “hero/heroine” type fighters in the lineup, which would be "probably not very interesting". Cecilia D'Anastasio of Kotaku praised the character as adding value to the gameplay of Super Smash Bros. Since the addition of Duck Hunt from Smash Bros., top Smash players wanted the Duck Hunt stage to be banned, due to its architecture forcing players to force each other and wait. In 2017, a player was noted for pulling off an upset victory over top-ranking player Zero who uses a top tier character Diddy Kong during the Super Smash Bros. for Nintendo 3DS and Wii U Genesis 4 Tournament. Kevin Wong of Complex included the Dog to his "best supporting character in video games", and stated that "Every frustrated player, at some point, tries and fails to shoot the Dog. Such is the love/hate relationship with our very first sidekick."

1UP.com listed him as the seventh best dog in video games, stating that even though he is annoying, he is ballsy enough to laugh at someone with a loaded rifle. GameDaily listed the dog as the third greatest in-game moment, and they stated that while dogs are man's best friend, that if the dog from Duck Hunt is man's best friend, they'd hate to meet their enemy. They also included him in their list of characters they wish they could kill, stating that almost everyone they talked to, even dog lovers, wanted to shoot him. In another GameDaily article, they state that the goal of the game was not just to shoot all of the ducks, but to avoid being laughed at by the dog. Nintendo Power listed the dog as one of the things they love to hate, stating that there isn't a Duck Hunt player in the world who hasn't wanted to shoot him. GameSpy listed the dog as the 10th favourite dog in video games, stating that while a dog in real life doesn't judge its master, the Duck Hunt dog unfortunately is not like that. both IGN and Nintendo Power have referred to the dog as something players "love to hate".

UGO.com listed the ability to kill the dog as one of the best video game urban legends, stating that it is one of the few video game urban legends based in actual truth, since players could shoot the dog in the arcade Vs. Duck Hunt. Official Nintendo Magazine listed him as the eighth greatest Nintendo moment, describing him as being smug and stating that they loath him. Video game developer Mastiff referenced the Duck Hunt dog in promoting their video game Remington Great American Bird Hunt, stating that Rockford, a dog in the game, will never laugh at players for missing the ducks. Courtney Enlow of Syfy described the dog as "one of the video game character that was our first experience being actively mocked by the game we were playing." Will Freeman of The Guardian listed the Duck Hunt dog as sixth of the best dogs in video games, stating that "Down the sights of a NES Zapper lightgun, there weren’t just ducks. There was a smug, fearless hound with opposable thumbs." Gavin Jasper of Den of Geek ranked the Duck Hunt duo as third of Super Smash Bros. Ultimate characters, praising the character addition to the roster and stated that "Video games are about making the impossible possible. So many years later, it was finally possible to get my revenge on that bane of a canine." Jeremy Parish of Polygon ranked 73 fighters from Super Smash Bros. Ultimate "from garbage to glorious", placing Duck as 33th on the list and stating that "the Duck Hunt gang’s presence is welcome... but only when someone else plays as them."

Amiibo
In September 2015, the Super Smash Bros. line of Amiibo released A Duck Hunt dog Amiibo collectible. Additionally, he is sold as well in the Amiibo Retro Pack, a 3 part Amiibo set including, Mr. Game and Watch and R.O.B.

The character can be scanned into the 3DS/Wii U and Ultimate titles, which a player can use to create a personal CPU, which can train and fight using artificial intelligence. The Amiibo can also be used to unlock a cosmetic option for Super Mario Maker.

References 

Video game characters introduced in 1984
Male characters in video games
Nintendo protagonists
Super Smash Bros. fighters
Nintendo characters
Video game sidekicks
Fictional dogs
Animal characters in video games
Fictional hunters
Video game memes